is a Japanese scientist. Kwansei Gakuin University, Department of Chemistry, School of Science and Technology, professor emeritus, Fellow.

He was born in Sakai, Osaka, Japan. In 1973, he had B.Sc. in Chemistry, Faculty of Science, Osaka University. In 1978, he had PhD in Physical and Inorganic Chemistry, Faculty of Science, Osaka University. He worked as a research associate (Fixed-term) in Division of Biological Sciences, National Research Council of Canada. In 1981, he became an instructor in Division of Biochemistry, Institute of Medical Science, The Jikei University School of Medicine, Tokyo, Japan and became an assistant professor there. From 1989 he started working as an associate professor in Department of Chemistry, School of Science, Kwansei Gakuin University, Nishinomiya, Japan. And he became a professor there in 1993. Because of the government reorganization, he became a professor in Department of Chemistry, School of Science and Technology, Kwansei Gakuin University from 2001. He was a dean of the School of Science and Technology, Kwansei Gakuin University from 2006 to 2010 and  he was a vice president from 2013 to 2018. He was also the president of The Spectroscopical Society of Japan (SPSJ) from 2014 to 2016.

He is a researcher in molecular spectroscopy in condensed phase, physical chemistry and analytical chemistry. He investigates basic studies and application of various spectroscopies, IR, Raman, NIR, FUV, and FIR/terahertz spectroscopy. He has made many achievements in spectroscopy which would be a bridge between the basis and the application. Recently, he is very active in application of quantum chemistry to molecular spectroscopy, developing a strong bridge between them. From 1999 to 2017, for 19 years in a row, he published more than 30 papers in a year and the number of his publications is now more than 1,000. In the eight years from 2010 to 2017, his papers have been cited more than 1,200 times in each year. His h-index is 69 and his citation index totals more than 22,000 so far.

Awards

International awards
 Tomas Hirschfeld Award (1998), International Consortium for Near Infrared Spectroscopy 
 EAS Award in Achievement in Near-Infrared Spectroscopy (2001), Eastern Analytical Symposium
 The Büchi NIR Award (2002), Büchi
 Gerald S. Birth Award (2006), The Council of Near Infrared Spectroscopy
 Dasari Lecture Award, George R. Harrison Spectroscopy Laboratory, MIT (2011)
 Bomem-Michelson Award (2014), The Coblentz Society
 China Friendship Award on Molecular Spectroscopy (2016), The Chinese Optical Society
 Pittsburgh Spectroscopy  Award (2019), The Pittsburgh Spectroscopy Society

Domestic awards
 The Young Scientist Award (1987) by The Spectroscopical Society of Japan. 
 The Spectroscopical Society of Japan Award (2002)
 Hyogo Prefecture Science Award (2003)
 Science and Technology Award of Ministry of Education, Culture, Sports, Science and Technology (2005)
 Japan Analytical Chemistry Society Award (2008)
 Japan Analytical Chemistry Society Advanced Analytical Technique Award (2011)
 The Chemical Society of Japan Award (2017)
 The Medal with Purple Ribbon (2018)

Distinctions and Honors
 Honorary Professor; Jilin University, Changchun, China (2007-).
 Honorary Professor; Changchun Institute of Applied Chemistry, Changchun, China (2007-).
 Special Merits Award, Kazakh National Technical University, Kazakhstan (2007). (4) Guest Professor; Peking University, Peking, China (2009-).
 Gold Medal Award, University of Wroclaw, Poland (2009).
 Changbai Mountain Friendship Award, China (2010).
 Dr. Ramachandra Rao Dassari Distinguished Lecture (Indian Institute of Technology (IIT), Kanpur) (2012).
 Jagiellonian University 650th Anniversary PLUS RATIO VIS Silver Medal.
 Doctor Honoris Causa, Jagiellonian University, Poland (2016)
 Adjunct professor, Ewha Womans University, Korea (2016)
 Honorary professor, Amity University Uttar Pradesh, India (2017)
 Honoring Award; “90th Anniversary of the discovery of Raman Effect” (2017). Bangalore, India
 Doctor Honoris Causa, University of Wroclaw, Poland (2019)

Fellows
 Fellow, Society for Applied Spectroscopy (2010).
 Fellow Award (2015). The Royal Society of Chemistry
 Fellow Award (2016). The Chemical Society of Japan
 Fellowship Award (2017). International Council of Near- infrared Spectroscopy

Publications

Books
 Y. Ozaki, I. Noda ed.: Two-Dimensional Correlation Spectroscopy, American Institute of Physics (2000)
 A. A. Christy, Y. Ozaki, and V. G. Gregoriou: Modern Fourier Transform Infrared Spectroscopy, Elsevier, Amsterdam (2001)
 H. W. Siesler, Y. Ozaki, S. Kawata, and H. M. Heise: Near-Infrared Spectroscopy, Principles, Instruments, Applications, Wiley-VCH, Weinheim, Germany (2002)
 I. Noda and Y. Ozaki: Two-Dimensional Correlation Spectroscopy, John-Wiley & Sons (2004)
 Y. Ozaki, W. F. McClure, and A. A. Christy: Near-Infrared Spectroscopy in Food Science and Technology, Wiley-Interscience, New York (2007)
 S. Sasic and Y. Ozaki ed.: Raman, Infrared, and Near-Infrared Chemical Imaging, John Wiley & Sons (2010)
 Y. Ozaki, K. Kneipp, and R. Aroca eds.: Frontiers of Surface-Enhanced Raman Scattering : Single Nanoparticles and Single Cells, Wiley (2014)
 Y. Ozaki and S. Kawata eds.: Far- and Deep-Ultraviolet Spectroscopy, Springer (2015)
 Y. Ozaki, G. Schatz, D. Graham, and T. Itoh, eds.: Frontiers of Plasmon Enhanced Spectroscopy, Vol. 1 & Vol. 2, ACS Symposium Series, American Chemical Society (2017)
 K. Kneipp, Y. Ozaki and Z.-Q. Tian, eds.: 45 years enhanced Raman signals - recent developments in plasmon supported Raman spectroscopy, World Scientific, in press (2017)
 M. Wojcik, B. Kirtman, H. Nakatsuji, Y. Ozaki, eds.: Frontiers of Quantum Chemistry, Springer (2017)

References

Links 
KAKEN - 尾崎 幸洋(00147290)

1949 births
Living people
People from Sakai, Osaka
Academic staff of Kwansei Gakuin University
Osaka University alumni
Japanese chemical engineers